Katrina Lea Webb-Denis, OAM (born 22 May 1977) is an Australian Paralympic athlete with cerebral palsy. She has won Gold, Silver and Bronze medals in athletics at three Paralympic Games.

Personal

Webb has a mild form of cerebral palsy which was diagnosed when she was two years old. Her parents did not tell her of the disability.  Her cerebral palsy was diagnosed again when she won an Australian Institute of Sport netball scholarship. AIS staff found a weakness in her right leg, which was shorter than her left leg. She was then encouraged to become involved in disability sport. After winning the 100m at the 1996 Atlanta Games, she faced criticism over her legitimacy to compete at the Games.

She has a physiotherapy degree from the University of South Australia. Her father Darryl played league football for North Adelaide Football Club. Her cousins are Olympic basketballer Rachael Sporn  and AFL players  Kieran  and Trent Sporn. She married former Australian Olympic water polo player Eddie Denis. Her first child  Sebastian Zavier Denis was born on 27 December 2007.

She was the first torch bearer to enter the Olympic Stadium for the Opening Ceremony of the Sydney 2000 Paralympic Games. In 2006 Katrina was selected to present on behalf of the International Paralympic Committee to the United Nations in New York.

In November 2017, Webb was inducted into the South Australian Sports Hall of Fame.

Athletic achievements 

 1994 all Australian Netball Squad 17 & under
 1995 Australian Institute of Sport Netball Scholarship
 1996 Atlanta Paralympic Games: Gold 100m, Gold 200m, Silver Long Jump
 1997 Medal of the Order of Australia for her gold medals in Atlanta
 1998 IPC Athletics World Championships:  Silver 400m, Silver 100m & Gold Javelin & WR 
 1997–2000 South Australian Athlete Ambassador for Health & Disabilities
 2000 Sydney Paralympic Games: Silver 400m, Silver 100m and Bronze 200m; Australian Sports Medal
 2001 Centenary Medal
 2002 World Athletic Championships: Silver 100m and  Silver 400m 
 2004 New World record for the 200m T38 class
 2004 Athens Paralympic Games: Gold 400m and Paralympic Record
 2004 South Australian Sports Institute Female Athlete of the Year
 2005 Australian Institute of Sport Athletics Scholarship Canberra
 2006 Melbourne Commonwealth Games Silver  100m

References

External links 
 

1977 births
Living people
Paralympic athletes of Australia
Cerebral Palsy category Paralympic competitors
Track and field athletes with cerebral palsy
Athletes (track and field) at the 1996 Summer Paralympics
Athletes (track and field) at the 2000 Summer Paralympics
Athletes (track and field) at the 2004 Summer Paralympics
Athletes (track and field) at the 2006 Commonwealth Games
Medalists at the 1996 Summer Paralympics
Medalists at the 2000 Summer Paralympics
Medalists at the 2004 Summer Paralympics
Paralympic gold medalists for Australia
Paralympic silver medalists for Australia
Paralympic bronze medalists for Australia
Commonwealth Games silver medallists for Australia
Recipients of the Medal of the Order of Australia
Recipients of the Australian Sports Medal
Recipients of the Centenary Medal
Sportswomen from South Australia
Australian Institute of Sport netball players
Australian female javelin throwers
Australian female long jumpers
Australian female sprinters
Commonwealth Games medallists in athletics
Sportspeople with cerebral palsy
Paralympic medalists in athletics (track and field)
Australian netball players
Netball players from South Australia
Medallists at the 2006 Commonwealth Games